Kajaanin Palloilijat (abbreviated KaPa) is a football club from Kajaani in Finland.  The club was formed in 1924. KaPa has played one season in the Finnish premier division Mestaruussarja in 1953. In 2006 the club's men's team merged with Tarmo and formed AC Kajaani, original KaPa has since focused on youth football.

History
In 1924 footballers from to local sports clubs, Kipinä and Ärjy, decided to form a new football club. Founding meeting was held on 3.7.1924 at a local cafeteria. Only 9 days later club played their first match against football club from Kuopio, match ended in a 1-1 draw. Club participated in Savo district leagues during the 1930s but was not allowed to participate in national competition due to the town's remote location, almost all other clubs at the time came from southern and western coast. In 1939 they were allowed to qualify to national leagues. In 1952 Club won a promotion to premier division, but was relegated after a single season. In the 1956 first division season KaPa came second just one point behind KoRe, missing promotion back to Mestaruussarja. Palloilijat spent most of its history in the second and third levels of Finnish football. In the 1970s another local club, Kajaanin Haka rose to prominence, which eventually led KaPa losing its long held position as leading football club of Kajaani, and relegating in to lower tiers in the 1990s. In 2006 the adults team merged with Tarmo to form AC Kajaani.

Season to season

1 seasons in Mestaruussarja
30 seasons in I Divisioona
26 season in Kakkonen
8 season in Kolmonen
1 season in Nelonen

References

External links
Official Website
Finnish Wikipedia

Football clubs in Finland
1924 establishments in Finland